Norman Thomas Boland (31 March 1900 – 14 April 1970) was an Australian politician.

He was born in Millie to grazier Matthew Boland and Alice Agnes Mullens. He was educated at St Joseph's College, Hunters Hill, and became a solicitor at Moree. He was twice married: first, on 12 January 1927, to Lena Mary Margaret Palmer, with whom he had seven children, and secondly, on 28 May 1962, to Marie O'Keefe. From 1966 to 1970 he was a member of the New South Wales Legislative Council; he was associated with the Independent Labor Group. Boland was in ill health for most of his political career and died in Sydney in 1970.

References

1900 births
1970 deaths
Independent Labor Group politicians
Members of the New South Wales Legislative Council
20th-century Australian politicians